Wedge resection of the lung is a surgical operation where a part of a lung is removed. It is done to remove a localized portion of diseased lung, such as early stage lung cancer.

References 

Lung cancer
Surgical oncology
Surgical removal procedures
Pulmonary thoracic surgery